The 27th Trampoline World Championships was held at Arènes de Metz in Metz, France from 11 to 13 November 2010.

Medal table

Medal winners

Results

Men

Individual
Qualification

Final

Double Mini

Tumbling

Synchro

Women

Individual
Qualification

Double Mini

Tumbling

Synchro

External links
 Sportcentric Site
 Official website (French)

Trampoline World Championships
Trampoline Gymnastics World Championships
Trampoline World Championships, 2010
International gymnastics competitions hosted by France